Kim Jong-pil (January 7, 1926 – June 23, 2018), also known colloquially as JP, was a South Korean politician and the founder/first director of the Korean Central Intelligence Agency (KCIA, now the National Intelligence Service). He served as Prime Minister twice, from 1971 to 1975 during the presidency of Park Chung-hee (1961–1979) and from 1998 to 2000 during the presidency of Kim Dae-jung (1998–2003). He was a nine term National Assembly member.

Early life 
Kim Jong-pil was born in Buyeo County, South Chungcheong Province. He initially attended Seoul National University's College of Education but graduated from the Korea Military Academy (KMA) in 1949 (8th graduating class). From September 1951 to March 1952, he studied at the U.S. Infantry School at Fort Benning, Georgia. He  participated in the Korean War as an intelligence officer of the Republic of Korea Army. He retired as a brigadier general.

Political career 

After the April Revolution, a citizens' and students' uprising against the Syngman Rhee dictatorship and election fraud in 1960, he engineered the May 16 coup, led by Major General Park Chung-hee in 1961 with his fellow Korea Military Academy (8th graduating class) classmates. He served in several high-profile offices, including Chairman of the ruling Democratic Republican Party during Park's eighteen year presidency until assassination in 1979.

In 1965, he spearheaded the establishment of diplomatic relations with Japan following the conclusion of Imperial Japanese rule of Korea. Japanese rule of Daeil Cheongoogwon was used as seed money for economic development of Pohang Steel and the Gyeongbu Expressway to achieve the Miracle on the Han River. The poverty of 60 dollars income to 30,000 dollars strong economy of South Korea. Income went from 60 South Korean Won to 30,000 South Korean Won, representing a robust economy.

In 1963, he founded the Democratic Republican Party which helped President Park Chung-hee strengthen his power and his party maintained supermajority during his presidency. From 1971 to 1975, he served as Prime Minister of South Korea. He assumed the same position from 1998 to 2000 during Kim Dae-jung's presidency as part of the Alliance DJP.

In 1987, Kim Jong-pil staged a political comeback by creating a new political party known as the New Democratic Republican Party (NDRP). Most of the key party members and backers were conservatives who had served with him under the Park Chung-hee administration. Key members included Choi Gak-kyu, Kim Dong-kun, Koo Ja-choon, Lee Hee-il, Kim Yong-tae, Cho Yong-jik, Kim Yong-hwan, Kim Moon-won, etc. As chairman of the NDRP, he ran for president and lost to Roh Tae-woo of the ruling Democratic Justice Party (DJP). In the 13th National Assembly legislative elections held in April 1988, the NDRP won 35 seats out of the 299-seat National Assembly. 

In January 1990, Kim Jong-pil led the merger of his party with the ruling DJP and opposition party, Kim Young-sam’s Reunification Democratic Party (RDP) to create the Democratic Liberal Party (DLP). Jong-pil became the Executive Chairman of the newly formed DLP and Kim Young-sam became the party's presidential nominee in the 1992 South Korea presidential elections, which he won.

The outline of Kim Jong-pil's positions hardly described the skill of the politician in navigating the complexities of South Korean politics. Scholars note that he mastered the art of political coalitions. This is demonstrated in the way he was able to reemerge politically stronger after suffering various political setbacks. For instance, by October 1997, Kim Jong-pil's popularity had fluctuated, hovering between 2.9 percent and 4.6 percent, which was attributed to his reputation as being an integral member of the authoritarian rule of Park Chung-hee. part. This was further aggravated by the conservative party's image problem, which was identified with old politicians who have ethical flaws.

Through clever political maneuvering, however, Kim Jong-pil struck a power-sharing deal with Kim Dae-jung's National Congress for New Politics, known as the DJP Alliance, which allowed him to choose half of the cabinet members of the Kim Dae-Jung administration. The deal also included his appointment as prime minister in March 1998 during Kim Dae-jung's presidency (1998-2003) for the second time.

In 2004, he announced his retirement from politics after his bid for a tenth term in the National Assembly failed and his party, the United Liberal Democrats, was unable to gain a sizable number of seats in the 2004 parliamentary election. The party later merged into Grand National Party.

Kim Jong Pil was the last of the "Three Kims," which refers to himself, Kim Young-sam, and Kim Dae-jung, who dominated South Korea's politics for decades. Fate had him elude the presidency on several occasions, earning him the title "the perennial no. 2 man."

Scouting 
He served as Korea Scout Association President until June 6, 1969. In 1967 he received the highest distinction of the Scout Association of Japan, the Golden Pheasant Award.

Ancestry  
He is the 12th generation descendant of Kim Ye-jik, a military officer who served at Injo Coup in 1623 during the early Joseon period, and a younger brother of Royal Noble Consort Gongbin. Both are children of Kim Hui-Cheol, known as Internal Prince Haeryeong, the Musin who was killed during the Imjin War in 1592. Hui-Cheol is great-grandson of Kim Young-jeong, both of them were civil ministers also during early Joseon period. Kim Young-Jeong is the 7th generation descendant of Kim Mok-kyung, the ancestor of the Gyeong branch of Gimhae Kim clan and the Samjungdaegwang during the reign of King Chunghye of Goryeo. Their lineage can be traced back to Kim Sam-kwang who was the son of Kim Yu-sin. This makes him a descendant of the royal family of Geumgwan Gaya.

This fact is also revealed in the 2001 sentimental letter written to Bhimlendra Mohan Pratap Mishra, a king of erstwhile Ayodhya state with a history of 200 years old, Kim talked about his March 2001 visit to India. He mentioned it "remained very meaningful to me" as it "fulfilled his desire to visit Ayodhya, a princess of which became the queen of King Suro of Gaya and Heo Hwang-ok. I am the 72nd generation descendant of the King Kim Suro of the Garak Kingdom."

Kim was amongst more than a hundred historians and government representatives, including the North Korean ambassador to India, and an 18-member delegation from South Korea – led by former Gimhae Mayor Song Eun-bok – composed of prominent industrialists who inaugurated a memorial to their royal ancestor, Queen Hwang Huh on the west bank of the River Sarayu. The monument was built using a three-metre high stone weighing 7,500 kg, specially shipped from South Korea.

Private life 
On February 15, 1951, Kim married Park Young-ok (October 30, 1929 – February 21, 2015), who was President Park Chung-hee's niece.

Kim died on June 23, 2018, at Sindang-dong, Seoul at the age of 92. His state funeral was held on June 24, 2018, and he was buried alongside his wife.

Quotes 
His words:

Jawuiban Tawuiban (자의반 타의반): half my will Half others will.

See also 
 Politics of South Korea

Notes

References 

1926 births
2018 deaths
People from Buyeo County
Gimhae Kim clan
Korea Military Academy alumni
Prime Ministers of South Korea
Directors of the Korean Central Intelligence Agency
Members of the National Assembly (South Korea)
United Liberal Democrats politicians
Converts to Protestantism from Buddhism
South Korean Protestants